Reticuloceratidae is one of five families of the Gastrioceratoidea superfamily. They are an extinct group of ammonoid, which are shelled cephalopods related to squids, belemnites, octopuses, and cuttlefish, and more distantly to the nautiloids.

Taxonomy
Family consists of 2 valid subfamilies:
Reticuloceratidae
Reticuloceratinae
Agastrioceras
Alurites
Aphantites
Arkanites
Bilinguites
Phillipsoceras
Quinnites
Reticuloceras
Retites
Tectiretites
Surenitinae
Gaitherites
Marianoceras
Melvilloceras
Surenites
Ugamites
Verneuilites

References

 The Paleobiology Database accessed on 10/01/07

 
Goniatitida families
Gastriocerataceae